Hanatori Tameike dam is an earth-fill dam located in Saga Prefecture in Japan. The dam is used for agriculture. The catchment area of the dam is 0.1 km2. The dam impounds about 3  ha of land when full and can store 244 thousand cubic meters of water. The construction of the dam was completed in 1969.

References

Dams in Saga Prefecture
1969 establishments in Japan